HPH may refer to

 Cat Bi International Airport, in Hai Phong, Vietnam
 Hawaii Pacific Health
 Health promoting hospitals
 Horsepower-hour
 Human-powered helicopter
 Hutchison Port Holdings
 HpH Ltd., manufacturer of the HpH 304 glider
 Human Powered Health (men's team), a professional cycling team
 Human Powered Health (women's team), a professional cycling team